Drzycim  is a village in Świecie County, Kuyavian-Pomeranian Voivodeship, in north-central Poland. It is the seat of the gmina (administrative district) called Gmina Drzycim.

The village has a population of 1,200.

History
During the German occupation of Poland (World War II), inhabitants of Drzycim were among the victims of a massacre of Poles committed by the German Selbstschutz in nearby Jastrzębie in January 1940.

References

Villages in Świecie County